The Lola T430 is an open-wheel formula race car, designed, developed and built by British manufacturer and constructor Lola Cars, for Formula 5000 racing, in 1976.

References

1976 in British motorsport
Formula 5000 cars
Motorsport in the United Kingdom
Open wheel racing cars